The Roman Catholic Diocese of Belize City–Belmopan is a diocese of the Latin Church of the Roman Catholic Church in continental Central America. The diocese comprises the entirety of Belize, the former British dependency British Honduras. It is a Latin suffragan of the Archdiocese of Kingston (on Jamaica) and a member of the Antilles Episcopal Conference, yet still depends on the missionary Roman Congregation for the Evangelization of Peoples.

The cathedral of the diocese, also known as its mother church, is Holy Redeemer Cathedral in Belize City. Our Lady of Guadalupe Co-Cathedral in Belmopan is the co-cathedral of the diocese.

History 
 The diocese was erected as the Apostolic Prefecture of British Honduras (the country's colonial name) on 10 June 1888, on territory split off from the then Apostolic Vicariate of Jamaica.
 It was elevated on 1 March 1893 as Apostolic Vicariate of British Honduras, hence entitled to a titular bishop. Its name was changed to the Apostolic Vicariate of Belize, after its see, on 15 December 1925.
 It was elevated to Diocese of Belize on 29 February 1956. On 31 December 1983 the name of the diocese was changed to Diocese of Belize City–Belmopan.

Statistics 
As per 2014, it pastorally served 162,100 Catholics (48.5% of 334,297 total) on 22,963 km² in 13 parishes and 5 missions with 46 priests (14 diocesan, 32 religious), 2 deacons, 95 lay religious (38 brothers, 57 sisters) and a seminarian.

Bishops
(all Roman Rite)

Ordinaries
Apostolic Prefect of British Honduras
 Salvatore di Pietro, SJ (10 June 1888 – 3 January 1893)

Apostolic Vicars of British Honduras
 Salvatore di Pietro, SJ (3 January 1893 – 23 August 1898)
 Frederick C. Hopkins, SJ (17 August 1899 – 19 April 1923)
 Joseph Anthony Murphy, SJ (11 December 1923 – 15 December 1925)

Apostolic Vicars of Belize
Joseph Anthony Murphy, SJ (15 December 1925 – 16 July 1938)
William A. Rice, SJ (19 November 1938 – 28 February 1946)
 David Francis Hickey, SJ (10 June 1948 – 29 February 1956)

Bishops of Belize City
 David Francis Hickey, SJ (29 February 1956 – 1 August 1957)
 Robert Louis Hodapp, SJ (2 March 1958 – 11 November 1983)

''Bishops of Belize City–Belmopan
 Osmond P. Martin (11 November 1983 – 18 November 2006) 
 Dorick M. Wright (18 November 2006 – 26 January 2017)
 Lawrence Sydney Nicasio (26 January 2017 – )

Auxiliary bishops 
 Osmond P. Martin (8 June 1982 – 11 November 1983), appointed Bishop here
 Dorick M. Wright (12 December 2001 – 18 November 2006), appointed Bishop here
 Christopher Glancy, CSV (18 February 2012 – )

See also 
 List of Catholic dioceses in Central America
 History of Roman Catholicism in Belize

References

External links 
 
 GCatholic, with Google map and satellite photo - data for all sections

Roman Catholic dioceses in North America
Roman Catholic Diocese 
Religious organizations established in 1888
Roman Catholic dioceses and prelatures established in the 19th century
Roman Catholic Ecclesiastical Province of Kingston in Jamaica